Sakari Olkkonen (15 January 1931 – 15 January 2002) was a Finnish gymnast. He competed in eight events at the 1960 Summer Olympics.

References

External links
 

1931 births
2002 deaths
Finnish male artistic gymnasts
Olympic gymnasts of France
Gymnasts at the 1960 Summer Olympics
Sportspeople from Vyborg
20th-century Finnish people